is an autobahn in Germany. It leads from Mannheim-Neckarau to Autobahnkreuz (motorway junction) Heidelberg.

History 
The planning for an Autobahn between Mannheim and Heidelberg began as early as 1926. It was taken into account in the planning for the HaFraBa (Hamburg-Frankfurt-Basel). The motorway was opened in 1935 under the Third Reich as a Reichsautobahn). It originally stretched from the eastern end of Mannheim (Schwetzingerstadt/Oststadt) to Heidelberg (Bergheim), Bergheimer Strasse. At the same time most of the crossing bridges were torn down and rebuilt with enough space to make room for an emergency lane on both sides. Until the mid-90s there was no speed limit on the A 656; today the speed limit is 120 km/h (75 mph).

Exit list 

Exits numbered from West to East.

|colspan="2" style="text-align:center;"||| to Mannheim

 

|-
|colspan="2" style="text-align:center;"||| to Heidelberg
|}

External links 

656
A656